James or Jim Kirkland may refer to:
 James I. Kirkland (born 1954), American paleontologist
 James Kirkland (boxer) (born 1984), American boxer
 James Hampton Kirkland (1859–1939), American academic
 James Kirkland (Irish giant)
 James Robert Kirkland (1903–1958), United States federal judge
 Jim Kirkland (born 1946), English footballer